Gillespie Creek is an intermittent stream or arroyo in Hidalgo County, New Mexico. Its waters in flood would reach Playas Lake. Its mouth is located 24 miles south southeast of Animas.

References

Rivers of Hidalgo County, New Mexico
Rivers of New Mexico